Her Master's Voice is a 1936 film directed by Joseph Santley and based on the 1933 play Her Master's Voice by Clare Kummer. The film's sets were designed by the art director Alexander Toluboff.

Plot
A wealthy woman moves her niece to her estate and away from her niece's jobless husband, who the aunt believes is a worthless bum. Through a misunderstanding, the husband is hired to work at the estate and complications ensue.

Reception
The film was not a financial success and recorded a loss of $2,300.

Cast
 Edward Everett Horton as Ned Farrar
 Peggy Conklin as Queena Farrar
 Laura Hope Crews as Aunt Minnie Stickney
 Elizabeth Patterson as Mrs. Ellie Martin
 Grant Mitchell as Horace J. Twilling
 Charles Coleman as Craddock
 Ruth Warren as Phoebe
 Dick Elliott as Police Captain
 Robert Homans as Stationmaster
 Fred Santley as Motorcycle Cop

References

External links

1930s English-language films
1936 films
1936 comedy films
American comedy films
Films produced by Walter Wanger
American black-and-white films
American films based on plays
Films directed by Joseph Santley
Paramount Pictures films
1930s American films